Standings and results for Group 2 of the UEFA Euro 1988 qualifying tournament.

Group 2 consisted of Italy, Malta, Portugal, Sweden and Switzerland. Group winners were Italy, who finished three points clear of second-placed Sweden.

Final table

Results

Goalscorers

References
UEFA Page
RSSSF Page

Group 2
1986–87 in Italian football
qual
1986–87 in Portuguese football
1987–88 in Portuguese football
1986–87 in Swiss football
1987–88 in Swiss football
1986–87 in Maltese football
1987–88 in Maltese football
1986 in Swedish football
1987 in Swedish football